David Owen (May 13, 1828 – January 28, 1893) was a member of the Wisconsin State Assembly.

Biography
Owen was born on May 13, 1828, in Merionethshire, Wales. He settled in what is now Caledonia, Columbia County, Wisconsin, in September 1846. On December 25, 1850, Owen married Jane Roberts. Owen and his family were Calvinistic Methodists. His brother William was also a member of the assembly. He died of heart disease at his home in Portage in 1893.

Career
Owen was a member of the assembly in 1877. Other positions he held include town supervisor, town assessor and town treasurer of Caledonia. He was a Republican.

References

External links

1828 births
1893 deaths
People from Merionethshire
Welsh emigrants to the United States
19th-century Methodists
People from Columbia County, Wisconsin
Republican Party members of the Wisconsin State Assembly
City and town treasurers in the United States
19th-century American politicians